Leopold IV of Austria (1371 – June 3, 1411), Duke of Further Austria, was an Austrian Habsburg Duke of the Leopoldinian Line, known as "the Fat".

Biography 
He was the second son of Leopold III. His eldest brother Duke William of Inner Austria took him as his effective co-ruler, putting him in particular charge of Further Austria, which also meant ancestral Habsburg lands in Swiss Aargau etc. Leopold was to face Swiss opposition to Austrian administration.

From 1391 onwards, he was the effective ruler of Further Austria, and from 1396 to 1406 he was ruler in Tyrol too.

He married Catherine de Valois of Burgundy, daughter of Philip II, Duke of Burgundy, in 1393.  She died in 1425, and they had no surviving children.

His younger brothers Ernest the Iron and Frederick were, for the time being, left to grow up. They were initiated with ducal positions in 1402. In 1406 their eldest brother Duke William died without leaving heirs, and Leopold became the next head of their family. Leopold had no sons either. The younger brothers made an agreement how to divide the patrimony in the future: Ernest was to receive Inner Austria and Frederick Further Austria, including Tyrol. Ernest took the reins in Styria, etc. Frederick was only barely in his twenties, but was put in charge in Tyrol. Leopold was left with responsibility of the Further Austrian territories, together with the position of head of the family.

In 1406, Leopold took over the guardianship of their young cousin Albert V, which resulted in conflicts with his brother Ernest.

Leopold died in Vienna and was buried in the Ducal Crypt in the city's cathedral.

Ancestors

References

External links

1371 births
1411 deaths
14th-century dukes of Austria
15th-century dukes of Austria
Counts of Tyrol
Burials at St. Stephen's Cathedral, Vienna